Dayi may refer to:
Dayi, Daman District,  village in Daman District, Kandahar Province, Afghanistan
Dayi method, a computer input method
South Dayi District, Volta Region, Ghana
North Dayi, one of the constituencies represented by the Parliament of Ghana
Dayi language, spoken by the Indigenous people of the Arnhem Land, Australia

China
Dayi County (大邑县), of Chengdu, Sichuan
Dayi, Yizheng (大仪镇), town in Yizheng City, Jiangsu
Dayi, Juye County (大义镇), town in Juye County, Shandong
Dayi, Leiyang (大义镇), a town of Leiyang City, Hunan